Gdynia Rzeźnia is a no longer operating PKP railway station in Gdynia (Pomeranian Voivodeship), Poland.

Lines crossing the station

References 
Gdynia Rzeźnia article at Polish Stations Database, URL accessed at 17 June 2006

Rzeznia
Disused railway stations in Pomeranian Voivodeship